Adam Mahrburg (6 August 1855 – 13 November 1913) was a Polish philosopher—the outstanding philosophical mind of Poland's Positivist period.

Life
Adam Mahrburg was a philosopher and theoretician of knowledge. He taught in Warsaw's secret university and published in learned and popular journals.

He reduced philosophy to the theory of knowledge.  He regarded science as a tool for ordering and anticipating phenomena and for effective action.  He was an exponent of determinism.

Works
Teoria celowości ze stanowiska naukowego (The Theory of Purpose from a Scientific Standpoint, 1888),
Co to jest nauka (What Is Science? 1897)

See also
History of philosophy in Poland
List of Poles

Notes

References
"Mahrburg, Adam," Encyklopedia Powszechna PWN (PWN Universal Encyclopedia), Warsaw, Państwowe Wydawnictwo Naukowe, vol. 2, 1974, p. 818.
Jan Zygmunt Jakubowski, ed., Literatura polska od średniowiecza do pozytywizmu (Polish Literature from the Middle Ages to Positivism), Warsaw, Państwowe Wydawnictwo Naukowe, 1979, .
Władysław Tatarkiewicz, Historia filozofii (History of Philosophy), volume 3: Nineteenth-Century and Contemporary Philosophy, Warsaw, Państwowe Wydawnictwo Naukowe, 1978, p. 178 and passim.

External links
Mahrburg Adam, Pisma filozoficzne, Tom 1  (Adam Mahrburg, Philosophical Writings, volume 1)

Positivists
1855 births
1913 deaths
19th-century Polish philosophers
20th-century Polish philosophers